Michael Magee (October 11, 1929 – July 15, 2011) was a Canadian actor, singer and author. He was known for voicing Cyril Sneer and his pet half dog/half aardvark Snag in the Canadian animated series The Raccoons and the voice for The Coach on the CBC show, Yes You Can.

He was also well-known for his alter-ego that he created in the 1970s known as Fred C. Dobbs. Dobbs first came to the public's attention when a daily telephone call from a crotchety commentator enlivened the Bruno Gerussi network radio program. In the mid-to-late 1970s, Magee starred in a series for Toronto's TVOntario called Magee & Company, in which he played numerous characters, including Dobbs.

In 1973, he created the show The Real Magees, where he and his wife Duddie were the hosts of this weekday, half-hour talk show, chatting informally with non-celebrities, such as a cab driver, ambulance driver and nightclub bouncer. Bob Weinstein produced the series in Montreal for Screen Gems and CBC Television.

He went on to work as a writer, producer, and commentator for the CBC racing telecasts from 1964 to 1986. The network won the Sovereign Award for outstanding film/video/broadcast in 1985. An avid racing historian, Magee authored the book, "Champions," in collaboration with Pat Bayes, which was published in 1980. He also was a renowned handicapper and one of his last official connections with racing was as the host of "Racing With Magee," a daily radio show that aired in the mid-1990s.

Magee died on July 15, 2011  at the age of 81. He had been suffering from colitis, which led to internal bleeding and heart stoppage.

References

External links
 

1929 births
2011 deaths
Canadian horse racing announcers
Canadian male television actors
Canadian male voice actors